Lenora Misa (born 19 December 1997) is a Samoan netball player who represents Samoa internationally and plays in the positions of goal defense and goal keeper. She made her maiden World Cup appearance representing Samoa at the 2019 Netball World Cup.

References 

1997 births
Living people
Samoan netball players
2019 Netball World Cup players
Queensland Fusion players
Australian Netball League players
Samoan expatriate sportspeople in Australia